Themselves, previously known as Them, is an American hip hop duo based in Oakland, California. It consists of Doseone and Jel. They are also part of Subtle and 13 & God. The duo's first studio album, Them, was included on Facts "100 Best Indie Hip-Hop Records of All Time" list.

History
Doseone and Jel met through Mr. Dibbs and formed Themselves. Then known as Them, the duo's first studio album, Them, was released in 2000. In 2002, Themselves released the second studio album, The No Music. A remix album, The No Music of AIFFs, was released in 2003. In 2009, Themselves released a mixtape, The Free Houdini, as well as the third studio album, Crowns Down. Another remix album, Crowns Down & Company, was released in 2010.

Members
 Doseone – vocals, production
 Jel – vocals, production

Discography
Studio albums
 Them (2000)
 The No Music (2002)
 Crowns Down (2009)

Mixtapes
 The Free Houdini (2009)

Remix albums
 The No Music of AIFFs (2003)
 Crowns Down & Company (2010)

Live albums
 Live (2003)
 Live II (2005)

Singles
 "Joyful Toy of 1001 Faces" (1999)
 "This About the City Too" (2002)
 "P.U.S.H." (2004)

Compilation appearances
 "It's Them" on Music for the Advancement of Hip Hop (1999)
 "Them's My Peoples" on A Piece of the Action (2001) 
 "My Way Out of a Paper Bag" on Giga Single (2001)
 "This About the City Too" on Urban Renewal Program (2002) 
 "Dark Sky Demo", "Poison Pit", "It's Them" and "Good People Check (Hrvatski Remix)" on Anticon Label Sampler: 1999-2004 (2004)
 "Take to the King" on African Jag Vol. 1 (2006)

References

External links
 Themselves at Anticon
 
 

Anticon
American hip hop groups
American musical duos
Hip hop duos
Musical groups from Oakland, California
Musical groups established in 1998